Championship of the Latvian SSR in football was a top competition of association football in the Latvian SSR in 1945-91 soon after the occupation of Latvia by the Soviet Union.

The competition was originally established in 1941 in place of the Virslīga, but was never finished due to invasion of the Soviet Union by Nazi Germany.

List of champions

 1941 Tournament Cancelled
 1942-1944 Tournament Interrupted
 1945 FK Dinamo Rīga
 1946 Daugava Liepāja
 1947 Daugava Liepāja
 1948 Žmiļova Komanda
 1949 Sarkanais Metalurgs Liepāja
 1950 AVN Rīga

 1951 Sarkanais Metalurgs Liepāja
 1952 AVN Rīga
 1953 Sarkanais Metalurgs Liepāja
 1954 Sarkanais Metalurgs Liepāja
 1955 Darba Rezerves Rīga
 1956 Sarkanais Metalurgs Liepāja
 1957 Sarkanais Metalurgs Liepāja
 1958 Sarkanais Metalurgs Liepāja
 1959 RER Rīga
 1960 ASK Rīga

 1961 ASK Rīga
 1962 ASK Rīga
 1963 ASK Rīga
 1964 ASK Rīga
 1965 ASK Rīga
 1966 ESR Rīga
 1967 ESR Rīga
 1968 Starts Brocēni
 1969 FK Venta Ventspils
 1970 VEF Rīga

 1971 VEF Rīga
 1972 FK Jūrnieks
 1973 VEF Rīga
 1974 VEF Rīga
 1975 VEF Rīga
 1976 Enerģija Rīga
 1977 Enerģija Rīga
 1978 Ķīmiķis Daugavpils
 1979 Elektrons Rīga
 1980 Ķīmiķis Daugavpils

 1981 Elektrons Rīga
 1982 Elektrons Rīga
 1983 VEF Rīga
 1984 Torpedo Rīga
 1985 FK Alfa
 1986 Torpedo Rīga
 1987 Torpedo Rīga
 1988 RAF Jelgava
 1989 RAF Jelgava
 1990 Gauja Valmiera
 1991 Forums-Skonto

See also
 Latvian Higher League

References

External links
 All Latvian champions including Soviet at RSSSF

Latvia
Soviet
1941 establishments in Latvia
1991 disestablishments in Latvia
Recurring sporting events established in 1941
Recurring events disestablished in 1991
 
Latvian Soviet Socialist Republic
Latvia
Latvia